Bona Panek has been the Governor of Twic, South Sudan since 24 December 2015. He is the first governor of the state, which was created by President Salva Kiir on 2 October 2015.

References

Living people
South Sudanese politicians
Year of birth missing (living people)